Matthieu Lièvremont (born 6 November 1975 in Perpignan) is a French rugby union player, usually playing as a flanker but sometimes as well as number 8. He currently plays for US Dax.

The younger brother of Marc and Thomas Lièvremont, both French international players, he received his first international cap on 28 June 2008 against Australia while Marc was France's head coach, which sparked some controversy.

References

1975 births
Living people
French rugby union players
US Dax players
France international rugby union players
Rugby union flankers
Rugby union number eights
Sportspeople from Perpignan
Stade Toulousain players
SU Agen Lot-et-Garonne players